The Bisoid (Phunoi) languages belong to the Southern Loloish (Hanoish) branch of the Sino-Tibetan language family. Most Bisoid languages are spoken in Phongsaly Province, northern Laos, with smaller numbers of speakers living in China (Yunnan), Vietnam (Lai Châu Province), Myanmar (Shan State), and northern Thailand.

Languages
The Bisoid languages are:

Bantang
Bisu (mBisu, Pisu)
Cantan
Cauho
Cốông
Habei (Mani)
Khongsat (Suma)
Laomian
Laopan
Laopin
Laoseng
Phongku (Phu Lawa)
Phongset
Phunoi
Phunyot
Pyen (Phen)
Sangkong
Sinsali (Singsili)
Tsukong

Classification

Bradley (2007)
David Bradley (2007) considers the following Bisoid dialects to be closely related.
Bisu: 500 ethnic members in northern Thailand, with far fewer speakers
Hpyin (Pyen): already reported as moribund in 1900, and replaced by Lahu
Laomian: 4,000 speakers (out of 5,000 ethnic members) in central Lancang County
Laopin: fewer than 1,000 speakers (out of 1,300 ethnic members) in Menghai County
 (Lao-Pan in Kingsada (1999))

Bradley (2007) lists the following Sinsali (formerly Phunoi) languages, which differ from each other.
Sinsali proper
 (Phongku in Kingsada (1999))
 (Laoseng in Kingsada (1999))
 (Bisu)

Other Bisoid languages include:
Phongset (Shintani 2001)
Phunyot (Kato 2008)

Udomkool (2006)
Kitjapol Udomkool (2006:34), citing data from Wright, also lists the following Bisoid (Phunoi) languages.
Tsukong [] (China): close to Cốông
Cauho [] (Laos): divergent
Bantang [] (Laos): divergent
Cantan [] (Laos): close to Sinsali

Kitjapol Udomkool (2006) gives the following computational classification for the Bisoid (Phunoi) group, using the UPGMA method.

Wright (n.d.)
Wright (n.d.) tentatively classifies the Singsali (Phunoi) languages of Phongsaly Province, Laos as follows. Phongku may or may not belong as the same group as Laoseng, Phongset, Cantan, and Singsali.
Bantang
Cauho
Laopan
(Core branch)
Phongku (?)
Laoseng
Phongset
Cantan, Singsali

Hsiu (2016, 2018)
Bisoid languages were also analyzed in a 2016 computational phylogenetic lexical analysis by Hsiu (2016).
Bisoid
Khongsat
Laoseng
Sangkong
Pyen
(core branch)
Lao-Pan
Bisu
Phunoi
Phongset
Phongku (Phu-Lawa)
Phunyot

The Bisoid classification above was subsequently revised by Hsiu (2018) as follows, with Habei added to  Bisoid.
Bisoid
Bisu cluster: Bisu, Laomian, Laopin, Pyen, Laopan
Singsali cluster: Phunoi, Singsali, Cantan, Laoseng, Phongku, Phongset, Phunyot
Coong cluster: Cốông, Sangkong, Tsukong
Cauho
Bantang
Khongsat
Habei (Mani)

Muda is also noted as having a Bisoid substratum and Akha superstratum. Khongsat and Laoseng have Siloid loanwords.

References

Lama, Ziwo Qiu-Fuyuan (2012), Subgrouping of Nisoic (Yi) Languages, thesis, University of Texas at Arlington (archived)
Kingsadā, Thō̜ngphet, and Tadahiko Shintani. 1999 Basic Vocabularies of the Languages Spoken in Phongxaly, Lao P.D.R. Tokyo: Institute for the Study of Languages and Cultures of Asia and Africa (ILCAA).
Shintani, Tadahiko, Ryuichi Kosaka, and Takashi Kato. 2001. Linguistic Survey of Phongxaly, Lao P.D.R. Tokyo: Institute for the Study of Languages and Cultures of Asia and Africa (ILCAA).
Kato, Takashi. 2008. Linguistic Survey of Tibeto-Burman languages in Lao P.D.R. Tokyo: Institute for the Study of Languages and Cultures of Asia and Africa (ILCAA).
Tun, Maung Maung. 2014. A Sociolinguistic Survey of Selected Bisoid Varieties: Pyen, Laomian and Laopin. Master's thesis.